Rasputina may refer to:
 Maria Rasputin (1898–1977), daughter of Grigori Rasputin
 Masha Rasputina (born 1965), Russian pop singer
 Rasputina (band), an American band
 Illyana Rasputina, a.k.a. Magik, a character in X-Men